Colin Fletcher Kirkus (18 September 1910 – 14 September 1942 was a British rock climber. He climbed extensively in Wales and elsewhere, such as the Alps and the Himalaya. He wrote the instruction book Let's Go Climbing! which inspired Joe Brown to take up the sport.

Early life
Kirkus was born in Liverpool, England on 18 September 1910

Climbing
Kirkus made pioneering climbs in Wales and elsewhere and wrote the instruction book Let's Go Climbing!.

Jack Longland described the greatest rock face in Wales, Clogwyn Du'r Arddu, as "Colin’s Cliff".

Kirkus' series of new routes on "Cloggy" was unparalleled until the emergence of Joe Brown, 20 years later.

Kirkus made a pioneering Alpine-style ascent in the Himalaya, in 1933. He climbed Satopant'h while a member of Marco Pallis's expedition; his account of the climb is included in Pallis's book Peaks and Lamas.

Death
Kirkus was killed in the Second World War, on a sortie to Bremen on the night of 13/14 September 1942. He was a navigator on Vickers Wellington BJ879 of 156 Squadron an RAF Pathfinder squadron. He was one of four brothers, all of whom saw flying service in the RAF, and three of whom were killed in action in the Second World War.

His name is listed on the Runnymede Memorial for airmen with no known grave.

References

Bibliography
 
 

British rock climbers
English mountain climbers
1910 births
1942 deaths
People from Liverpool
Royal Air Force Volunteer Reserve personnel of World War II
Royal Air Force personnel killed in World War II
Royal Air Force officers
Military personnel from Liverpool